Nam Từ Liêm (South Từ Liêm) is an urban district (quận) of Hanoi, the capital city of Vietnam. It was formed on 27 December 2013, when the rural Từ Liêm district was split into two urban districts: Bắc Từ Liêm and Nam Từ Liêm. The district currently has 10 wards, covering a total area of 32.19 square kilometers. As of 2019, there were 264,246 people residing in the district, the population density is 8200 inhabitants per square kilometer.
The district is known for its many new urban developments and several skyscrapers.

Geography
Nam Từ Liêm is bordered by Bắc Từ Liêm to the north, Cầu Giấy to the east, Thanh Xuân to the southeast, Hà Đông to the south and Hoài Đức to the west.

Administrative division
Nam Từ Liêm is divided into 10 wards (phường):
 Cầu Diễn
 Mỹ Đình 1
 Mỹ Đình 2
 Trung Văn
 Đại Mỗ
 Tây Mỗ
 Mễ Trì
 Phú Đô
 Phương Canh
 Xuân Phương

Education
 Japanese School of Hanoi
 Vietnam-Australia School, Hanoi

Transportation
 Mỹ Đình Bus Station – a major bus terminal in western Hanoi, with metropolitan buses and long distance buses to provinces north and northwest of Hanoi.

Notable buildings

References

Districts of Hanoi